The Brockville Tikis are a Canadian junior ice hockey team in Brockville, Ontario.  They play in the Eastern Ontario Junior Hockey League of Hockey Eastern Ontario. Between 2014-15 and the end of the 2019-2020 seasons, the EOJHL and the CCHL set a new agreement  in an attempt to create a better player development model. This resulted in the league re-branding itself as the Central Canada Hockey League Tier 2 (CCHL2), and shrinking to 16 teams and two divisions. The league reverted to the Eastern Ontario Junior Hockey League for 2021.

History
The Tikis were almost retracted by the new CCHL2 in 2015 after 48 seasons in their community.  The team was saved by the new ownership of the Brockville Braves who bought the team with the wish to be affiliated with them.

Season-by-season results

External links
Tikis Webpage
CCHL2 Webpage

Eastern Ontario Junior Hockey League teams
Sport in Brockville
Ice hockey clubs established in 1967
1967 establishments in Ontario